Coenagrion lyelli is a species of damselfly in the family Coenagrionidae,
commonly known as a swamp bluet. 
It is a medium-sized damselfly, the male is bright blue with black markings.
It is found in south-eastern Australia, where it inhabits streams, pools and lakes.

Gallery

See also
 List of Odonata species of Australia

References 

Coenagrionidae
Odonata of Australia
Insects of Australia
Endemic fauna of Australia
Taxa named by Robert John Tillyard
Insects described in 1913
Damselflies
Taxobox binomials not recognized by IUCN